Mehiata Riaria (born August 5, 1991, in Tahiti, France) is a French model and beauty pageant titleholder who was crowned 2014 Miss France 1st runner-up.

Personal life
Riaria lives in Tahiti. In 2013 she was crowned Miss Tahiti.

Miss France 2014
Mehiata represented Tahiti and placed as first runner up at the Miss France 2014.

References

Living people
1991 births